Parliament building and variations may refer to:

Casa de la Vall: a two building complex (old and new)  in Andorra la Vella, Andorra
Palace of the Argentine National Congress, in Buenos Aires, Argentina
Austrian Parliament Building
Bangladesh Parliament Building
Parliament Buildings (Barbados), a two building complex in Bridgetown, Barbados
Brussels Parliament building
Parliament Hill for the Canadian Parliament Buildings
British Columbia Parliament Buildings, the official name of the provincial legislative buildings in Victoria, British Columbia, Canada
First Ontario Parliament Buildings
Parliament Building (Quebec), an eight-floor building and home to the Parliament of Quebec
Estonian Parliament Building
Finnish Parliament Building
Parliament Building, Guyana
Hungarian Parliament Building
Parliament Buildings (Kenya)
New Zealand Parliament Buildings
The Beehive, the executive wing of the New Zealand Parliament Buildings
Sri Lankan Parliament Building
Old Parliament Building, Colombo
Palace of Westminster, for the United Kingdom Parliament Buildings
Parliament Buildings (Northern Ireland), at Stormont in Belfast, Northern Ireland
Scottish Parliament Building, the home of the Scottish Parliament at Holyrood

See also
Houses of Parliament (disambiguation)
Parliament House (disambiguation)
Capitol (disambiguation)
Diet (assembly)
Legislative building
Reichstag
Forum (Roman)
Senate
Knesset